The Heroic Corps was an organization founded in Korea in 1919, during the Japanese colonial period. Its activists believed in revolutionary uprising as well as egalitarianism.

After the March 1st Movement was crushed in 1919, many independence activists moved their bases to foreign countries. However, members of the Heroic Corps thought that those organizations were too moderate and would not contribute to independence in Korea, and instead took a more radical approach by opposing compromising solutions such as culturalism. The Heroic Corps wished for a violent revolution, reflected by the Manifesto of the Korean Revolution by independence activist Shin Chae-ho. The Corps struggled for independence by assassinating high-ranking Japanese officials and committing acts of terrorism against government offices. The Heroic Corps moved their base to Beijing, China and brought members to Shanghai where they had about 70 members in 1924. Kim Gu, Kim Kyu-sik, Kim Chang-suk, and Shin Chae-ho were engaged as advisers and Chiang Kai-shek, President of the Republic of China, supported the Heroic Corps. However, as time passed, their movement evolved with the spirit of the times.

Targets and Doctrines

Leading the Corps was a 22-year-old man named Kim Won-bong (1898 –  1958). The organization was based on ten articles of resolution, which listed seven types of individuals who must be killed and five governmental structures that must be destroyed. Their aims were to defeat the Japanese invaders, gain independence for Korea, abolish class distinctions, and establish equal rights to arable land. Their ideals displayed a new wave of revolutionary public activity in the fight for independence in direct response to the March 1st Movement.

10 articles of resolution

We aggressively pursue all acts of righteousness.
We sacrifice our body and life for Korean independence and world equality.
We only select members of loyal spirit and compassionate mind.
We take the objective of the Corps as first priority and promptly execute the goals of its members.
We select a leader of righteous character to represent the Corps.
We present a status report, wherever or whenever the Corps may be, every month.
We oblige to assemble upon request by a member of the Corps.
We stay alive to fulfill the objective of the Corps.
We as members devote ourselves to the Corps and the Corps devotes itself to every one of us.
We execute all those who disobey the objectives of the Corps.

List of 7 types of people who must be killed

Josean Governor-General
Head of Japanese Troops
Taiwan Governor-General and High Officer
Traitors
Pro-Japanese Leaders
Secret Agents of Japan
Anti-National Nobles and Large Property-Owning Landlords

List of 5 governmental structures that must be destroyed

Japanese Government-General of Korea
Oriental Development Company
Office of Maeil-Shinbo
All Police Offices
Other buildings of the Japanese government within Korean lands

Main Events

Carrying bombs into Miryang, Jinyeong
The Heroic Corps carried out their plan for the assassination of Japanese ministers and the destruction of public offices in March 1920. They attempted to carry bombs into Josean. Kwak Jae-ki, who was in Manchuria, sent bombs to Kim Byung-wan. However, the bombs were confiscated by Japanese police in Gyeonggi-do. Kwak Jae-ki, who was in charge, and 12 people related to this incident were arrested by Japanese police.

Throwing bombs at Jogono Police Station and incident in Sampantong, Hyoje-dong
On January 12, 1923, bombs were thrown into the Jongno Police station. On January 17, Japanese police searched Sampanong, Kim Sang-ok's refuge. Surrounded by 20 police officers, Kim Sang-ok exchanged gunfire, killing the head of the criminal department and wounding several other police officers. He escaped the siege to hide on Namsan Mountain, disguising himself as a monk, and hid in Lee Hye-soo's house in Hyoje-dong. On January 22, several hundred armed policemen besieged the house. By himself, Kim Sang-ok resisted the Japanese for over three hours. He killed several policemen, including executives, before committing suicide with his last bullet. Japanese police authorities did not identify Kim Sang-ok as the bomber until after he had died.

Throwing bombs at Josean Sikesan Bank and Oriental Development Company
On December 28, 1926, at 2 p.m., Na Seok-ju entered Joseon Siksan Bank and threw one bomb. Later that day, he attacked the  Oriental Development Company by throwing bombs and spreading gunfire at random. He killed several people in the company. Five Japanese policemen chased him, and he ultimately used his gun to kill himself and avoid arrest.

References

1919 establishments in Korea
Anarchism in Korea
Defunct anarchist organizations
Korean independence movement